Brestov is a village and municipality in Humenné District in the Prešov Region of north-east Slovakia. The mayor is Ľudmila Nováková (Independent).

History
In historical records the village was first mentioned in 1567.

Geography
The municipality lies at an altitude of 206 metres and covers an area of 10.122 km².
It has a population of about 545 people.

Genealogical resources
The records for genealogical research are available at the state archive "Statny Archiv in Presov, Slovakia"

 Roman Catholic church records (births/marriages/deaths): 1802-1911 (parish B)
 Greek Catholic church records (births/marriages/deaths): 1768-1946 (parish B)

See also
 List of municipalities and towns in Slovakia

References

External links
 
stats

Villages and municipalities in Humenné District
Zemplín (region)